The 1976 BYU Cougars football team represented Brigham Young University during the 1976 NCAA Division I football season. The Cougars were led by fifth-year head coach LaVell Edwards and played their home games at Cougar Stadium in Provo, Utah. The team competed as a member of the Western Athletic Conference, winning a share of the conference title with Wyoming with a conference record of 6–1. BYU was invited to the 1976 Tangerine Bowl, where they lost to Oklahoma State.

Schedule

Personnel

Season summary

Kansas State

Colorado State

    
    
    
    
    
    
    
    
    
    

Gifford Nielsen completed 13 of 32 passes for 174 yards before leaving late in the final quarter while John VanDerWouden set a single-game conference record with four touchdown receptions. LaVell Edwards beat Colorado State for the first time since taking over BYU in 1972.

at Arizona

at San Diego State

Wyoming

Southern Mississippi

Utah State

Arizona State

UTEP

at New Mexico

at Utah

Tangerine Bowl (vs Oklahoma State)

References

BYU
BYU Cougars football seasons
Western Athletic Conference football champion seasons
BYU Cougars football